Hasan Güngör (5 July 1934 – 13 October 2011) was a middleweight Turkish wrestler (79 kg before 1961, 87 kg after 1961) and a wrestling coach. He won a gold medal at the 1960 Olympics and a silver medal at the 1964 Olympics, as well as multiple medals at the World, European and Balkan championships. After retiring from competitions in 1967, Güngör worked for more than 20 years as a coach of the junior and senior national teams. Güngör was married and had three children. He lived in Denizli until his death.

References

External links
 

1934 births
2011 deaths
People from Acıpayam
Wrestlers at the 1960 Summer Olympics
Wrestlers at the 1964 Summer Olympics
Turkish male sport wrestlers
Olympic silver medalists for Turkey
Olympic gold medalists for Turkey
Olympic medalists in wrestling
Medalists at the 1964 Summer Olympics
Medalists at the 1960 Summer Olympics

Mediterranean Games gold medalists for Turkey
Competitors at the 1963 Mediterranean Games
Mediterranean Games medalists in wrestling
20th-century Turkish people